Bhoite is a surname found amongst the Maratha caste, mainly in the state of Maharashtra in India but it also appears in Indian states bordering Maharashtra.

Origin
Some sources, such as Shri Swami Samartha states Bhoites are Suryavanshi clan of Marathas.

Titles

The Bhoites alienated to the number of social honours given to them by the administrators whom they served, People on whom they had rule viz. Patil, Deshmukh, Shiledar (military rank), Bargir, Sarkar, Sardeshmukh, Sardar (military rank), Naik (military rank), Inamdar, Watandar, Sarnoubat (military rank), Senapati (military rank), Senakarta (military rank), Jagirdar, Zamindar, Saranjamdar, Raja.

Sub-clans
 Bhapkar: a sub-clan having their capital at Loni Bhapkar (Baramati).
 Yewale: a sub-clan found in northern Maharashtra, in towns such as Yeola, Niphad, and the Nashik District.
 Lokhande: a sub-clan that adopted the name Lokhande.
and some bhoite live in Niphad Talwade

Distribution

Maharashtra 

They supported Chhatrapati Shivaji Maharaj to find Hindavi Swarajya. The Modi script sources shows Bhoites from Satara villages helped Chhatrapati Shivaji in the Battle of Fort Subhanmangal at Shirwal on 8 August 1648. Bhoites played an active role in the Maratha fight against Aurangzeb, and in many other conflicts in Indian history. The Bhoites were faithfuls of Peshwa. They were the first leaders of Maratha Troop to march against Ahmadshah Abdali and routed to him in 1761, and revolt against the British in 1857. In service of princely states like Satara, Gwalior, Baroda, Nagpur, Kolhapur and in the 1942 parallel government of Satara under Krantisinha Nana Patil and also in Sansthani Praja Parishada Movements in British Phaltan State. The Bhoites were founder leaders of Patri Sarkar of Satara. They also ruled several estates in Maharashtra like Jalgaon Saranjam. Bhoites are among few of these Marathas who remained loyal and faithful to Maratha Empire from its foundation to the collapse. Bhoites are founders of both Education Societies Viz. Rayat Shikshan Sanstha(1919), Biggest education society of Maharashtra being Supporters of Karmaveer Bhausaheb Patil

Madhya Pradesh
In Madhya Pradesh, Bhoites are present near Gwalior, Indore, and the Guna region where Marathas dwell. The Shindes of Gwalior, Gaekwads of Baroda, Pawars of Dhar and Dewas, Holkars(Dhangar) of Indore are the Sardars of Peshwa Period like Sardar Ranoji Bhoite but after the defeat in Panipat the Bhoites died in larger extent and no other was able to establish power like above rulers. They established himself there along with Maratha rulers. Until Maratha Empire in 1818, they remained powerful royal knights with some other allies. One of the Bhoite stem in Tadawale are in Guna since Peshwa Period, who are the relatives of Shinde Maratha clan of Kanherkhed holding some properties.

Gujarat
In the state of Gujarat, the Bhoites being closest faithfuls of Chhatrapati Shahu were representatives of him in Baroda early in the 18th century.

Overseas
The Bhoites are present historically in the Mauritius through marriage alliances with Jagtap, Nikam, Yadav, Sawant, More, chavan and others of Maratha Community. They trace their lineage back to the rebellions of 1857 war against British.

Notables
  Ratoji Bhoite Patil, the hereditary Patil of Tadawale Sammat Wagholi, surrounding area comprising villages under Chhatrapati Shivajis Jurisdiction and before King Shivaji era(Under Deccan Sultanates).
 Ranoji Bhoite, an 18th-century Sarnoubat (commander in chief) of the Maratha army

See also
 Maratha Empire
 Maratha clan system
 List of Maratha dynasties and states
 Bhonsle
 Gaekwad
 Scindia
 Satara
 Wagholi
 Tadavale S.Wagholi
 Hingangaon
 Jawali
 Aradgaon
 Bhoite Saranjam

References

Sources

Marathi language

English language

 section covering Maratha knights.

 The Brahmavansha stem of Bhoite.

Maratha clans
Surnames
Social groups of Maharashtra